Jennifer Necole Webb (born December 12, 1979) is an American politician from Florida. She served one term in the Florida House of Representatives, representing parts of coastal southwestern Pinellas County from 2018 to 2020.

Political career

Webb was elected in the general election on November 6, 2018, winning 53 percent of the vote over 47 percent of Republican candidate Ray Blacklidge.

She was the first out lesbian to serve in the legislature.

References

External links
Florida House of Representatives - Jennifer Webb

Democratic Party members of the Florida House of Representatives
Living people
21st-century American politicians
21st-century American women politicians
Women state legislators in Florida
LGBT state legislators in Florida
Lesbian politicians
1979 births
Louisiana State University alumni
University of South Florida alumni